Sleepless is an album by the English folk musician Kate Rusby, released in 1999. It was nominated for the Mercury Prize the same year.

Critical reception
The Washington Post wrote that Rusby "often creates ... ambience at the cost of blurring her melodies and stories; her vowels frequently flood the music until the consonants and rhythms are submerged in a tide of poignancy."

Track listing
"The Cobbler's Daughter" (Kate Rusby/Traditional)
"I Wonder What is keeping my True Love This Night" (Traditional)
"The Fairest of all Yarrow" (Kate Rusby/Traditional)
"The Unquiet Grave" (Kate Rusby/Traditional)
"Sho Heen" (Kate Rusby)
"Sweet Bride" (Kate Rusby)
"All God's Angels" (Kate Rusby)
"The Wild Goose" (Traditional)
"The Duke and the Tinker" (Kate Rusby/Traditional)
"Our Town" (Iris DeMent)
"The Sleepless Sailor" (Kate Rusby)
"Cowsong"
"Botany Bay" (Kate Rusby/Traditional)

Personnel
 Kate Rusby - vocals, piano, guitar 
 Dave Burland - vocals
 Ian Carr - guitar
 Andy Cutting - diatonic accordion
 Donald Hay - percussion
 Conrad Ivitsky - double bass
 John McCusker - fiddle, banjo
 Michael McGoldrick - whistle, flute
 Francis Macdonald - percussion
 Tim O'Brien - vocals, mandolin
 Darrell Scott - guitar
 Andy Seward - double bass
 Roger Wilson - vocals, guitar

References

Kate Rusby albums
1999 albums